Sir Nicholas Wyndham Partridge  (born 28 August 1955) is a British health care and HIV/AIDS care activist.

Early life 
Partridge was born in Rickmansworth on 28 August 1955 to Miles and Patricia Partridge. He attended West Somerset School in Minehead. He studied international relations at Keele University and graduated with a Bachelor of Arts (BA) degree in 1978.

Activism
Partridge worked for the Terrence Higgins Trust from 1985, when he started in the postroom, subsequently working his way to become chief executive in 1991, a post he held until 2013. There was controversy about his final salary on retirement: although not identified, three senior employees of the Terrence Higgins Trust were on salaries above £60,000, including one paid £140,000 to £149,999 and another paid £210,000 to £219,999.

He was also chair of Involve, an advisory group of the National Institute for Health and Care Research (NIHR) promoting public involvement in public health and social care research.

He lives in Peckham, London, with his partner, Simon Vearnals, a counselling psychologist. They entered into a civil partnership in 2008.

Honours
In 1999 he was appointed Officer of the Order of the British Empire (OBE) in recognition of his contribution to the charitable sector and was appointed a commissioner of the Commission for Health Improvement. Partridge was knighted in the 2009 New Year Honours. He was awarded an honorary DLitt from Keele University in 2008 and an honorary DSc from De Montfort University in 2011.

In 2006, he was declared one of the 100 most influential gay and lesbian people in Britain by The Independent; and in 2010 was ranked 75th (rising from 89th the previous year) in the same list.

References

Living people
Alumni of Keele University
Gay men
English LGBT rights activists
Knights Bachelor
Officers of the Order of the British Empire
Alumni of the London School of Economics
1955 births